Demetrius Fordham is an American portrait photographer and author. His work is particularly known for exploring the themes of the human identity, discrimination and inequality, sustainability and the natural world.

His work has been published by international magazines and newspapers such as W Magazine, Condé Nast Traveler, Condé Nast Traveler India, Elite Traveler, The Wall Street Journal, Schön Magazine, LensCulture  and other publications. Fordham is a member of American Society of Media Photographers (ASMP) and one of the contributors of Hachette.

Life and career 
He was born in Stuttgart, Germany, and raised between Stuttgart and Denver, Colorado. He began his career in New York, shooting editorial and commercial photography.

Publications

Books

References 

1981 births
Living people
American portrait photographers
American non-fiction writers